"Lies" is a song by the British band Thompson Twins. It was released as the first single from the album Quick Step & Side Kick (Side Kicks in the U.S.), and the song peaked at number 67 on the UK singles chart. The single fared better in the United States, where it peaked at number 30 on the Billboard Hot 100 chart in the spring of 1983. Along with the B-side track "Beach Culture", "Lies" also spent two weeks at number one on the American dance chart in January 1983, becoming the band's second number one on this chart ("In the Name of Love" had spent five weeks atop this chart in 1982).

Content
Singer Tom Bailey said, "We [he and Alannah Currie] were just trying to be wacky and a little bit crazy and come up with an idea that we could be irreverent about. The chorus - that kind of catcall chorus, singing, 'lies, lies, lies' - it's the kind of thing you might see in a playground, a school, where someone's calling out like that. But we tried to make it more universal and apply it to bigger issues in the world."

Music video
The music video was directed by Maurice Phillips and received airplay on MTV and other video programs. Three pairs of feet jut from the blankets at the foot end of an oversized bed, bouncing back and forth to the rhythm of the song, as a variety of sights pass in a room similar to Bowman's bedroom in 2001: A Space Odyssey or a Magritte painting. The end of the video, in which a nurse pulls a privacy screen into place and leans toward the camera with thermometer in hand, establishes that the bed's occupants are patients in a hospital.

Track listing
 12-inch single (ARIST 12486, ARIST 12 486)
"(Bigger & Better) Lies" - 6:35
"(Long) Beach Culture" - 6:48

 7-inch single (ARIST 486) 
"Lies" - 3:10
"Beach Culture" - 3:55

Charts

In Popular Culture
The song appeared in the 2010 Regular Show episode “Grilled Cheese Deluxe”.

See also
 List of number-one dance singles of 1983 (U.S.)

References

1982 singles
1982 songs
Arista Records singles
Thompson Twins songs
Songs written by Alannah Currie
Songs written by Tom Bailey (musician)